William Jennys (1774–1859), also known as J. William Jennys, was an American primitive portrait painter who was active from about 1790 to 1810.  He traveled throughout New England seeking commissions in rural areas and small towns.

His early works are characterized by broadly modeled faces with a minimum of costume detail and bare backgrounds.  Both the costumes and backgrounds became more detailed as his career progressed.  The Connecticut Historical Society (Hartford, Connecticut), Currier Museum of Art (Manchester, New Hampshire), the Farnsworth Art Museum (Rockland, Maine), the Lyman Allyn Art Museum (New London, Connecticut), the Honolulu Museum of Art, the Metropolitan Museum of Art (New York City), the Minneapolis Institute of Arts, the Museum of Fine Arts, Boston, the National Gallery of Art (Washington D.C.), the Rockefeller Folk Art Collection (Colonial Williamsburg) the Utah Museum of Fine Arts (Salt Lake City), the Museum of Arts and Sciences (Daytona Beach) and Wake Forest University Fine Arts Gallery (Winston-Salem, North Carolina), are among the public collections holding work by William Jennys.

References
 Chotner, Deborah, American Naive Paintings, Washington, National Gallery of Art, 1992.

External links

 William Jennys in ArtCyclopedia

Gallery

18th-century American painters
18th-century American male artists
American male painters
19th-century American painters
19th-century American male artists
American portrait painters
1774 births
1859 deaths